Bulbine francescae is a species of plant in the genus Bulbine. It is endemic to Namibia.  Its natural habitat is rocky areas.

References

Flora of Namibia
francescae
Least concern plants
Taxonomy articles created by Polbot